Walter Davies CBE (1865 – 30 September 1939), was a British Insurance Chairman and Liberal Party politician.

Background
Davies was born the son of John Davies, of Manchester. In 1890 he married Mary Beresford. They had one son and one daughter. He became a JP in 1912. He was appointed a CBE in 1923.

Professional career
Davies was Chairman of the Manchester Insurance Committees. He was Hon. Secretary to the Manchester Committee for National Savings and a Member of the National Committee.

Political career
Davies was Liberal candidate for the Manchester Hulme division at the 1922 General Election, aligned with the main party under the leadership of H. H. Asquith. He was Liberal candidate for Hulme again at the 1923 General Election, after David Lloyd George's National Liberals had merged with the main Liberal party. On both occasions he was unsuccessful and did not stand for parliament again.

Electoral record

References

1865 births
1939 deaths
Liberal Party (UK) parliamentary candidates